Tsukaguchi Station (塚口駅) may refer to:
Tsukaguchi Station (Hankyu)
Tsukaguchi Station (JR West)